The 2022 Major League Rugby Final was the fourth Major League Rugby (MLR) championship match, held at the conclusion of the 5th season of the rugby union club competition in North America. The match was played on June 25, 2022, at the Red Bull Arena in Harrison, New Jersey. It was the first MLR Final to be held in New Jersey, and the first not to be held in California. Rugby New York emerged victorious over the Seattle Seawolves by a score of 30-15.

Background

On November 9, 2021, Major League Rugby announced the format of the 2022 season and post-season. The competition had expanded to 13 teams with the addition of the Dallas Jackals, and all teams were scheduled to play 16 games over the 18 week regular season. The teams were again divided into 2 conferences, Eastern and Western. Due to the odd number of teams, the Western conference   had 7 teams, and the Eastern conference had 6 teams. This was the first time in MLR history that teams would not face all other opposition teams in the regular season. Western teams faced their conference rivals in a double round-robin format, and played 4 Eastern teams, either home or away. Eastern teams faced their conference rivals in a double round-robin format, with one additional game. They then played 5 Western teams, to complete the 16 games required for the season.

For the post-season, MLR introduced a first-round, single game playoff, called Eliminators. The 2nd ranked team in each conference hosted the 3rd ranked team, while the 1st ranked team received a bye week. The following weekend, the 1st ranked team hosted the winner of their conference's Eliminator in their Conference Final. The winner of the Conference Finals met in the Championship Final to determine the winner of the 2022 season.

On June 3, 2022, MLR announced that the Austin Gilgronis were disqualified from the 2022 post-season, due to "violation of league rules". Following the conclusion of the regular season, the Eastern-qualified teams all had greater table points than any of the Western-qualified teams. As such, the 2022 Championship Final was guaranteed to be hosted by an Eastern Conference team for the first time.

On June 7, 2022, MLR announced that the LA Giltinis were also disqualified from the 2022 post-season, again due to "violation of league rules".

Championship Series

Eastern Conference
The Eastern Eliminator featured Rugby ATL hosting Rugby New York at Silverbacks Park. This marked the successive year of Atlanta hosting New York in the Championship Series, having faced each other in the 2021 Eastern Conference Final.

The first half of the match was focused on defensive decisions, and forcing penalties, as the visitors led 9-6 at halftime. The first try of the game was scored in the 44th minute, when referee Mike Lash awarded a penalty try to New York. Although Atlanta reduced the deficit with penalties, New York scored another try from the driving maul to effectively seal their victory. Atlanta were able to score a consolation try at the end of the match, but were unable to overcome New York. 

The Conference Final was hosted by the New England Free Jacks, at Veterans Memorial Stadium. This was New England's first appearance in the Championship Series since joining the league in 2020.

Although New England were able to score first and maintained the lead at half-time, it was New York that was able to seal the victory with two tries in the second half. The victory marked New York's first Eastern Conference Championship win, and the first time that the team that finished first in the Eastern Conference did not reach the Championship Final.

Western Conference
The Western Eliminator featured the Seattle Seawolves hosting the San Diego Legion at Starfire Stadium. Seattle and San Diego returned to the Championship Series for the first time since 2019, where both teams contested in that season's Championship Final.

Although San Diego were the first team to get on the scoreboard, the impressive points total from AJ Alatimu alone was enough to see off the Legion, as Seattle claimed a fifth successive win in their MLR post-season matches, as well as a 3-0 winning streak over San Diego.

The Conference Final was hosted by the Houston SaberCats, at AVEVA Stadium. This was the first time Houston had reached the Championship Series, and the first Championship Series game ever to be hosted in Texas.

Despite scoring first, Houston were outmatched by Seattle, with the visitors able to take the lead early on in the match, and retained it throughout the game. This result awards Seattle their first Western Conference Championship, their third appearance in the Championship Final, and the first time the first-ranked team in the Western Conference did not reach the Championship Final (since the conference system was introduced.)

Venue

On June 21, it was announced that the Championship Final would be held at the Red Bull Arena, in Harrison, New Jersey. The Arena had previously hosted rugby union matches, including an Premiership Rugby match between London Irish and Saracens, as well as an International game between the United States and Ireland. This was the first time that an MLR Championship Final match was held at a venue that wasn't the home ground of any MLR team.

Broadcasting

The match was broadcast in the United States on Fox Sports, and available internationally on The Rugby Network.

Championship final

Details

References

Major League Rugby Finals
2022 in American rugby union
Rugby union matches
Major League Rugby Final